In Old Colorado is a 1941 American Western film directed by Howard Bretherton and written by J. Benton Cheney, Russell Hayden and Norton S. Parker. The film stars William Boyd, Russell Hayden, Andy Clyde, Margaret Hayes, Morris Ankrum, Sarah Padden and Cliff Nazarro. The film was released on March 14, 1941, by Paramount Pictures.

Plot

Cast 
 William Boyd as Hopalong Cassidy
 Russell Hayden as Lucky Jenkins
 Andy Clyde as California Carlson
 Margaret Hayes as Myra Woods
 Morris Ankrum as Joe Weiler
 Sarah Padden as Harriet Ma Woods
 Cliff Nazarro as Nosey Haskins
 Stanley Andrews as George Davidson
 James Seay as Hank Merritt
 Morgan Wallace as Sheriff Collins
 Weldon Heyburn as Henchman Blackie
 Eddy Waller as Jim Stark

References

External links 
 
 
 
 

1941 films
American black-and-white films
Films directed by Howard Bretherton
Paramount Pictures films
American Western (genre) films
1941 Western (genre) films
Hopalong Cassidy films
1940s English-language films
1940s American films